Achaea leucopera is a species of moth of the family Erebidae first described by Herbert Druce in 1912. It is found in Cameroon, Gabon and the Democratic Republic of the Congo.

References 

Achaea (moth)
Insects of Cameroon
Erebid moths of Africa
Moths described in 1912